The Chongryu Bridge (청류교) is one of the six major bridges in Pyongyang crossing the Taedong River. Like the Rungra Bridge (릉라교) on its south, Chongryu Bridge passes through Rungra Island.

References

Bridges in North Korea
Buildings and structures in Pyongyang